Leptogenys processionalis, is a species of ant of the subfamily Ponerinae.

Subspecies
Leptogenys processionalis distinguenda Emery, 1887 - Borneo
Leptogenys processionalis processionalis Emery, 1887 - India, Sri Lanka, Vietnam

References

Animaldiversity.org
Itis.org
Images at Wikimedia

External links

 at antwiki.org

Ponerinae
Hymenoptera of Asia
Insects described in 1851